Puerto Rico Highway 135 (PR-135) is a rural road that travels from Adjuntas, Puerto Rico to Lares. This highway begins at PR-123 north of downtown Adjuntas and ends at PR-128 in Bartolo.

Major intersections

See also

 List of highways numbered 135

References

External links
 

135